The 2002 World Allround Speed Skating Championships were held in Thialf in Heerenveen, Netherlands, on 15, 16 and 17 March 2002.

The German Anni Friesinger and the Dutch Jochem Uytdehaage became the world champions.

Men championships

Allround results

Men championships

NQ = Not qualified for the 10000 m (only the best 12 are qualified)DQ = disqualified

Women championships

Allround results 

NQ = Not qualified for the 5000 m (only the best 12 are qualified)DQ = disqualified

Rules 
All 24 participating skaters are allowed to skate the first three distances; 12 skaters may take part on the fourth distance. These 12 skaters are determined by taking the standings on the longest of the first three distances, as well as the samalog standings after three distances, and comparing these lists as follows:

 Skaters among the top 12 on both lists are qualified.
 To make up a total of 12, skaters are then added in order of their best rank on either list. Samalog standings take precedence over the longest-distance standings in the event of a tie.

References
Results on SpeedSkatingNews

World Allround Speed Skating Championships, 2002
2002 World Allround
World Allround, 2002
World Allround Speed Skating Championships, 2002